Amir Obeid, known professionally as Amir Obè (born 1989), is an American rapper, singer-songwriter, and record producer of Sudanese-Polish descent from Detroit, Michigan. He started his music career in 2009 as Phreshy Duzit and signed to Atlantic Records. He later left the label to reinvent his style and changed his name to Amir Obè and found his own collective Neighborhood PHCK$. Obè rose to fame by releasing the mixtape, Detrooklyn in 2014. In 2015, he released the EP, Happening in the Grey Area and then 2016's, Won't Find Love in the Hills. On December 1, 2016, Amir announced that he had signed a deal with Def Jam Recordings, and that an album is set to release sometime in 2017. His debut single on Def Jam, "Wish You Well" was released on March 9, 2017.

Life and career

1990–2012: Early life and career beginnings 
Amir Obè was born in Detroit, then moved to New York City.
His mother is Polish and a music teacher and his father is Sudanese. Obè's father listened to Michael Jackson growing up and was heavily influenced by Pharrell Williams and Kanye  Obè played football in the street and rode his bike. During high school, he kept going back and forth from New York City to visit his sister. Obè played basketball in high school. He played one and two, point guard and shooting guard. He also played AAU, but in high school he was best offensive player in junior year and senior year.

When Obè was 16 or 17, he bought a computer mic and made song called, "Step Your Swag Up", which was his first. His parents didn't know he made music because he did it privately, but basketball was his main priority at the time. After high school, Obè started pursuing a music career and moved back to Brooklyn. Obè was first known as an artist when he went by the name of Phreshy Duzit on Myspace. He had about 100,000 fans and every week he kept releasing new freestyles and started seeing attention and getting messages from record labels. He eventually got signed to Atlantic Records. When Obè was 18, he made a friendship with PartyNextDoor on Twitter, who at the time went by "Jahron B". At that time, he was always songwriting and producing, so he'd always send him beats.

Obè released his debut EP, Brave New World on April 15, 2011 on Atlantic Records. The EP was entirely produced by NYLZ. Soon after, Obè left the label to revamp his style and described the record deal as "bullshit". On August 27, 2012, he released his debut mixtape, The New Religion on his own independent record label Neighborhood PHCK$ and After Platinum Records. It has guest appearances from Cory Gunz, Jon Connor, and Los and includes production from NYLZ, Daniel Worthy, Rich Flyer, and Obè himself. He revealed he got signed to After Platinum by releasing the mixtape.

2014–present: Rise to fame and collaborations 
Obè changed his name to Amir Obè in 2014 when he released the mixtape, Detrooklyn. The mixtape was released on After Platinum Records and included production from NYLZ, Vinylz, and Daniel Worthy. "I started feeling like both these places were the same place, so it was an imaginative project talking about my upbringing and my philosophies as an early teen 'till where I'm at now", says Obè. In the fall of 2014, Oliver El-Khatib (Drake's manager and co-founder of OVO Sound) spoke to Obè and told him Drake is a fan of Detrooklyn. Because of that, Obè sent him music and got positive feedback.

In February 2015, Obè co-produced, "Star67" for Drake, which appeared on If You're Reading This It's Too Late. Soon after, there was a rumor being passed around that Obè signed to OVO Sound, but he confirmed it wasn't true. Obè opened for PartyNextDoor on tour and the two collaborated on multiple songs. Obè released his second EP, Happening in the Grey Area on December 11, 2015. The album contains guest appearances from PartyNextDoor and Eli Sostre and includes production from NYLZ, The Mekanics, Daniel Worthy, Wondagurl, OZ and more. On March 11, 2016, Obè released his third EP, Won't Find Love in the Hills on Neighborhood PHCK$ and Empire Distribution. It has production from NYLZ, OZ, Eli Sostre, The Mekanics, STWO, and Ashton Mills. In late March 2016, Amir Obe was featured on Toronto R&B/Electro singer GOV's single Wrong One/Reflectin produced by frequent collaborator NYLZ and was the lead single from GOV's Nights EP which was premiered via Complex Magazine.

On December 1, 2016, Amir Obe announced his signing to Def Jam Records.  In early 2017, Amir Obe was featured on Toronto based artist keffaleng's EP, ”Not So Famous” on the Davinci produced single, “Yeah, Yeah”.

Obè's "Wish You Well" is featured on the soundtrack for Madden NFL 18.

Discography

Extended plays

Mixtapes

Singles

As lead artist

As featured artist

References

External links 

 

Living people
African-American male rappers
Musicians from Brooklyn
Musicians from Detroit
African-American record producers
Record producers from New York (state)
Atlantic Records artists
21st-century American rappers
21st-century American male musicians
1989 births
21st-century African-American musicians
20th-century African-American people